Mediator of RNA polymerase II transcription subunit 14 is an enzyme that in humans is encoded by the MED14 gene.

The activation of gene transcription is a multistep process that is triggered by factors that recognize transcriptional enhancer sites in DNA. These factors work with co-activators to direct transcriptional initiation by the RNA polymerase II apparatus. The protein encoded by this gene is a subunit of the CRSP (cofactor required for SP1 activation) complex, which, along with TFIID, is required for efficient activation by SP1. This protein is also a component of other multisubunit complexes e.g. thyroid hormone receptor-(TR-) associated proteins which interact with TR and facilitate TR function on DNA templates in conjunction with initiation factors and cofactors. This protein contains a bipartite nuclear localization signal. This gene is known to escape chromosome X-inactivation.

Interactions
MED14 has been shown to interact with PPARGC1A, Estrogen receptor alpha, STAT2, Cyclin-dependent kinase 8, Glucocorticoid receptor and Hepatocyte nuclear factor 4 alpha.

References

Further reading